Richard Childress Racing (RCR) is an American professional stock car racing team that currently competes in the NASCAR Cup Series and the NASCAR Xfinity Series. The team is based in Welcome, North Carolina, and is owned and operated by Richard Childress. In the Cup Series, the team currently fields two Chevrolet Camaro ZL1 teams: the No. 3 full-time for Austin Dillon and the No. 8 full-time for Kyle Busch. In the Xfinity Series, the team currently fields three Chevrolet Camaro teams: the No. 2 full-time for Sheldon Creed, the No. 3 part-time for Ty Dillon,  and the No. 21 full-time for Austin Hill. RCR has had at least one car successfully qualify for every Cup race since 1972, the longest such active streak, and is known for the longstanding use of the number 3 on its primary race car.

In addition to its in-house Cup Series teams, RCR has several technical alliances and partnerships with other teams. In the Cup Series, it is allied with Kaulig Racing, Legacy Motor Club, Live Fast Motorsports, and Trackhouse Racing Team, while Big Machine Racing and Jordan Anderson Racing have a technical alliance with the team in the Xfinity Series. Beyond this, RCR also has collaborative agreements with Beard Motorsports, although these are not technical alliances.

RCR has won NASCAR's Cup Series championship six times, all with driver Dale Earnhardt, as well as the Daytona 500 three times; Earnhardt in 1998, Kevin Harvick in 2007, and Austin Dillon in 2018. The team has also fielded cars for notables such as Jeff Burton, Mike Skinner, Ricky Rudd, Neil Bonnett, Ryan Newman, and Clint Bowyer.

Cup Series

Xfinity Series

Car No. 2 history

Kevin Harvick (1999–2001)
RCR has fielded this entry in the Nationwide Series since the fall North Carolina Speedway race in 1999, moving the entire team from the Craftsman Truck Series. Kevin Harvick was the first driver of the No. 2 AC Delco-sponsored Chevy, winning three races and winning Rookie of the Year along with a third-place points finish, despite missing the spring race at North Carolina Speedway. He went on to win the championship in the Busch Series in 2001 while running full-time in Winston Cup as well.

Johnny Sauter (2002) and Ron Hornaday Jr. (2003-2004)
In 2002, rookie driver Johnny Sauter won at Chicagoland and finished 14th in points.
The next year, Ron Hornaday Jr. drove the car full-time, winning one race and posting a third-place finish in points. He followed up that performance with another win and a drop to fourth in points the following year. Hornaday was not re-signed for 2005.

Clint Bowyer (2005-2008)
In 2005, Clint Bowyer took the wheel, in a program headed up by veteran crew chief Gil Martin, winning at Nashville Speedway and Memphis Motorsports Park to finish second in points. Bowyer was back in the No. 2 car in 2006 with crew chief Dan Deeringhoff, while Martin moved up to run the No. 07 Jack Daniels-sponsored Cup car for Bowyer's rookie season. Bowyer would finish 3rd in points with a win a Dover. 2006 was the final year for longtime sponsor AC Delco (sister company GM Goodwrench also withdrew from the Cup Series after 2006); for 2007, BB&T signed on as the sponsor, with Bowyer running 21 races in the No. 2. Kenny Wallace drove for the team in a one-race deal at Gateway International Raceway, with a sponsorship from sandwich chain Jimmy John's. In 2008, Bowyer returned full-time, scoring 18 Top 10s in the first 21 races including a win at Bristol.

Development drivers (2009)
In 2009, the No. 2 team ran a partial schedule with Sean Caisse and Austin Dillon sharing the ride. The team shut down after 2009.

Elliott Sadler (2012)

In late 2011, Kevin Harvick sold off his KHI organization, with the Nationwide Series team and equipment going to Childress' stable. KHI's 2 car, driver Elliott Sadler, and sponsor OneMain Financial moved over to RCR. Sadler continued on the success from KHI, finishing second in the 2012 drivers championship for the second year in a row to Ricky Stenhouse Jr. Even though Sadler scored four wins, it was announced in September that he turned down an extension offered by Childress to continue in the second tier series; he and sponsor OneMain Financial moved to Joe Gibbs Racing in 2013, which included a start in the Cup Series.

Brian Scott (2013–2015)

For 2013, former JGR driver Brian Scott took the wheel of the No. 2 under a multi-year contract (essentially swapping rides with Sadler). He brought sponsorship from the Idaho-based Shore Lodge and Whitetail Club, owned by his father. The No. 2 team also switched back to RCR-style angled number logos from KHI-style logos. Scott had markedly improved consistency from his crash-marred seasons with Gibbs, with three Top 5s and 13 Top 10s en route to a seventh-place points finish. Scott's best run by far was at Richmond in September, where he led won the pole and led 229 laps. before being passed on the restart by Brad Keselowski with 11 laps to go, finishing second. Scott's team protested the restart-in-question, and after the race stated "We deserved to win that race."

In the spring Richmond race, Scott and Nelson Piquet Jr. got into altercations on the cool-down lap and on pit road following several on-track incidents that carried over from prior races. During the physical altercation, which got both teams' crew members involved, Piquet was shown kicking Scott in the groin, which Scott called "just a chicken move." Scott finished 20th in the race.

Scott returned RCR in 2014, which included several starts in the No. 33 Cup car. Scott's performance continued to improve, winning another Richmond pole (in the Spring race), poles at both Chicagoland races, and was in contention to win several races. Scott ended the year with career bests in Top 5 finishes (six), Top 10s (23), and average start and finish (6.5 and 9.5 respectively). He would come away with a career-best fourth place in the championship standings, losing a numerical tiebreaker for third with former RCR driver Elliott Sadler.

For 2015, Scott returned to the No. 2 Camaro, with Mike Hillman Jr. replacing Phil Gould as crew chief. Scott left the team for Richard Petty Motorsports in Cup Series at the end of the season.

Multiple drivers (2016–2017)
In 2016, the No. 2 began fielding variety of drivers driving including Austin Dillon and Paul Menard, with sponsorship from Rheem and Menards. Dillon and Menard would run 27 races combined, with the former winning at Auto Club and the fall Bristol race. Sam Hornish Jr., Ben Kennedy, Michael McDowell, and Regan Smith would also round out the No. 2 lineup. Hornish would win the spring Iowa race, while McDowell would take his first NASCAR victory at Road America. The 2 team would finish 6th in owners points.

For 2017, Dillon and Menard continued to run the No. 2 Camaro. Neither Dillon nor Menard won a race that year, with the No. 2 car having a best finish of 2nd in the Lilly Diabetes 250 with Menard behind the wheel.

Matt Tifft (2018)

On October 5, 2017, it was announced that Matt Tifft will be the driver of the No. 2 car in 2018 and compete for the NASCAR Xfinity Series Championship.

Tyler Reddick (2019)

Defending Xfinity Series champion, Tyler Reddick was signed to the team for 2019. He ended up winning his second championship and was the first championship that was won back-to-back while driving for different teams (2018 was in JR Motorsports).

Myatt Snider (2021)
On December 10, 2020, it was announced that Myatt Snider will drive the No. 2 car full-time. Snider picked up his first career win in the Contender Boats 250.

Sheldon Creed (2022–present)
On September 14, 2021, it was announced that Sheldon Creed will drive the No. 2 car full-time in 2022 replacing Snider. On April 12, 2022, crew chief Jeff Stankiewicz was suspended for four races after the car lost a ballast during the 2022 Call 811 Before You Dig 250 at Martinsville Speedway. At the September Darlington race, Creed scored a career-best second place after engaging in a three-car battle with race winner Noah Gragson and Kyle Larson on the closing laps.

Car No. 2 results

Car No. 3 history

Dale Earnhardt Jr (2002, 2010)
The No. 3 car was initially run in the then-Busch Series by Dale Earnhardt, Inc. beginning in 1989, winning two back-to-back championships with Dale Earnhardt Jr. in 1998 and 1999. The No. 3 made its debut as part of the RCR stable in 2002 at the EAS/GNC Live Well 300 at Daytona, driven twice that year by Earnhardt Jr. with sponsorships from the Nabisco brands Oreo and Nilla. Earnhardt won the Daytona race but finished 36th at the Carquest Auto Parts 300 at Charlotte after being involved in a crash. The No. 3 car returned for one race in 2010 at the Subway Jalapeño 250 at Daytona with a sponsorship from Wrangler, in a joint venture between RCR, JR Motorsports, and Dale Earnhardt, Inc. The car was once again driven by Earnhardt Jr. with a paint scheme resembling the one used by his late father when he first drove for RCR. Earnhardt would go on to win the race, his first victory in 87 Nationwide Series starts, and the first victory in a Nationwide Car of Tomorrow. Prior to the start, Earnhardt Jr. claimed that it would most likely be the last time he would drive the No. 3 car.

Austin Dillon (2012–2013)

In 2012, the team moved to full-time status with Childress's grandson Austin Dillon driving, led by crew chief Danny Stockman. The team had a sponsorship from AdvoCare for 20 races, and Bass Pro Shops and American Ethanol for the others. Dillon stayed in the championship hunt throughout the season, sweeping both Kentucky races and easily claiming Rookie of the Year. Dillon would finish third in points behind teammate Elliott Sadler and champion Ricky Stenhouse Jr. Dillon returned in 2013, with a sponsorship from AdvoCare covering the entire season. Despite not going to victory lane, the No. 3 team scored five consecutive poles midway through the season and seven total on the year. Dillon managed to stay consistent enough to beat Sam Hornish Jr. for the championship, becoming the first team to win a championship without a victory. Austin would move up to the Cup Series in 2014.

Ty Dillon (2014–2017)
For 2014, younger brother Ty Dillon took over the No. 3 for 2014 with sponsorships from Yuengling, Bass Pro Shops, and WESCO. Dillon earned a pole in the third race of the season at Las Vegas, and scored his first career victory at the famed Indianapolis Motor Speedway after leading 24 laps, one of only three rookies to win a race in 2014. Dillon earned three poles, seven Top 5 finishes, and 24 Top 10 en route to a fifth-place points finish, losing Rookie of the Year honors to champion Chase Elliott. He followed it up with a career-best 3rd place in points for 2015 and 5th place in 2016 despite not winning a race either year.

Multiple drivers (2017–2018)

In 2017, Ty Dillon would run 27 of the 33 races alongside his rookie Cup Series campaign. Scott Lagasse Jr. and Brian Scott would round out the No. 3's schedule.

In 2018, Ty would share the No. 3 with his brother Austin along with Jeb Burton and Shane Lee. Brendan Gaughan also drove the No. 3 in 2018.

Part-time (2022-Present)
The No. 3 car returned for one race in 2022. The car was driven by Jeffrey Earnhardt. It was the first time that Earnhardt drove the No. 3, the number made famous by his grandfather Dale when he drove for RCR in the Cup Series, in NASCAR and the first time he drove for RCR in NASCAR. He finished the race in a career-best second place.

On January 25, 2023, RCR announced Ty Dillon will drive the No. 3 car part time in 2023 with sponsorship coming from Ferris

Car No. 3 results

Car No. 21 history
Mike Dillon (2000)
The No. 21 debuted in 2000, with Rockwell Automation as the sponsor and Childress' son-in-law Mike Dillon as the driver. Dillon posted two Top 10 finishes and finished 23rd in points that year.

Multiple drivers (2001)
Six races into 2001, Dillon was injured at Bristol Motor Speedway and it was announced at the time he would be out for the rest of the season. Since then, he has taken on other roles with the team. His replacement was Mike Skinner but after his injury, Jeff Purvis briefly took over, winning at Pikes Peak, before Skinner returned. After Skinner's release, Robby Gordon had the driving duties for the balance of the season.

Jeff Green and Jay Sauter (2002)
The next year, Jeff Green and Jay Sauter drove the car. With Green winning twice at Bristol and Charlotte and Sauter having a best finish of 4th at Nashville

Kevin Harvick and others (2003–2007)

In 2003, the team set out to win the Busch Series Owner's Championship with a sponsorship from The Hershey Company's PayDay brand. Cup Series driver Kevin Harvick was tabbed to drive 15 of the 34 races, with development driver Johnny Sauter filling out the rest of the schedule. Harvick ended up competing 19 races, with three wins and Top 10s in all but one race, and RCR became the first team to win an owner's points title with two different drivers. Harvick would serve as the team's anchor driver there afterwards, with Clint Bowyer doing the co-driving honors in 2004 and Brandon Miller in 2005 and sponsorships from Reese's Peanut Butter Cups. Jeff Burton drove the car at Bristol in 2005. In 2006, Harvick and Burton split the driving duties in the car with sponsorship from United States Coast Guard, as Harvick attempted to run the entire Busch Series schedule in three different cars. Burton won at Atlanta, and Harvick won three more races, pulling out to an over 700-point lead in the points standings with five races to go in the 2006 season. AutoZone replaced the sponsorship with Coast Guard in 2007, and Harvick drove along with development driver Timothy Peters, until Peters was replaced by multiple dirt late model series champion Tim McCreadie.

Multiple drivers (2008, 2010)
Beginning in 2008, Bobby Labonte was tapped to drive the 21 car for 15 races of the season. In May 2008, the team shut down due to financial problems but returned at the Emerson Radio 250 to debut Austin Dillon, son of former driver Mike Dillon and grandson to Richard Childress.

In 2010, RCR hired John Wes Townley as the driver of car No. 21, with family-owned Zaxby's as the sponsor. On April 9, Townley was pulled from the No. 21 car after a practice crash at Phoenix, which had proceeded an arrest for possession of alcohol as a minor. RCR said the move was for precautionary reasons, but Townley never returned to the team and would return to his former team RAB Racing. Clint Bowyer took over driving duties at Phoenix, and Scott Riggs drove at Nashville and Kentucky in June. Zaxby's, meanwhile, scaled back to sponsoring 21 of the season's 35 races. After the July Daytona race, Morgan Shepherd stepped behind the wheel for several weeks, taking a break for Bristol to handle his car for Faith Motorsports, which didn't make the field. RCR and Shepherd formed Shepherd Racing Ventures on August 31 to keep the No. 21 running the rest of the year. Bowyer drove with the Zaxby's sponsorship at Atlanta, Richmond, Charlotte, and Texas while Shepherd drove either without a sponsor or with limited sponsorship from Zaxby's and other companies for the other seven races. Following the season, Shepherd returned full-time to his Faith Motorsports operation with RCR transferring the No. 21 owners points to Shepherd, while RCR shut the 21 team down.

Part-time (2011–2013)
In 2011, RCR briefly restarted its Nationwide program, running a few races with development driver Tim George Jr. and sponsorship from Applebee's. In 2012, the No. 21 ran at Charlotte and Homestead with Joey Coulter. The car returned in 2013 with Dakoda Armstrong, Brendan Gaughan, and Kevin Harvick driving, taking a best finish of fifth at Indianapolis.

Daniel Hemric (2017–2018)

The No. 21 was revived for Daniel Hemric who drove full-time in 2017 and 2018. Despite being a consistent front runner, Hemric never won a race before moving up to the Cup series for the 2019 season.

Part-time (2019)
RCR cut back to one full-time team with the No. 21 running a limited schedule with Kaz Grala and Joe Graf Jr.

Multiple drivers (2020)
In 2020, the No. 21 was returned to full-time competition after inheriting the No. 2 owner points. This car was shared by Myatt Snider, Anthony Alfredo, Kaz Grala, and Earl Bamber.

Austin Hill (2022–present)
On October 29, 2021, it was announced that RCR would field two full-time cars again in 2022, with their second car driven by Austin Hill. On January 21, 2022, RCR revealed on their website that Hill's car number would be the No. 21. Hill began the season with a win at Daytona. He also won at Atlanta on his way to the playoffs. Hill was eliminated following the Round of 8 after finishing ninth at Martinsville as a result of a collision with Snider. Following the race, Hill punched Snider in the face on pit road. At the end of the season, he finished sixth in the points standings and won the 2022 NASCAR Xfinity Series Rookie of the Year honors.

Hill began the 2023 season by winning his second straight season opener at Daytona. He also scored wins at Las Vegas and Atlanta.

Car No. 21 results

Car No. 29 history
Part-time (2002–2006)

The 29 car first appeared in 2002, with Kevin Harvick (driver of the 29 Cup Series car) running four races with sponsorship from GM Goodwrench, Action Racing Collectibles, Sonic, and Sylvania. Jim Sauter also made his final career start at the Milwaukee Mile with Rockwell Automation and Nilfisk-Advance sponsorship, racing as a teammate to his sons Jay and Johnny and against his other son Tim. The car appeared again in 2003 at Homestead-Miami Speedway with Johnny Sauter driving and the PayDay sponsorship, as a thank you from Richard Childress for Sauter's help in winning the 2003 owners' championship for the 21 team. In 2004 several drivers including Bobby Labonte, Tony Stewart, Ricky Craven, Brandon Miller and Kevin Harvick ran in the 29.

The 29 car returned in 2005 at Bristol Motor Speedway as part of a promotion for Reese's Chocolate and Peanut Butter Lovers Cups. The promotion involved the 29 painted as the Chocolate Lovers car and the 21 painted as the Peanut Butter Lovers car. The plan was for Jeff Burton to drive the 29 while Kevin Harvick would drive the 21. Qualifying was rained out, so the entries were switched to assure that both cars would make the field (Harvick was a past champion and the No. 29 was not locked in). Burton drove the 21 while Harvick drove the 29. Harvick won the race in this car with Burton finishing second in the 21. Later in the season, Mayflower Transit came on to sponsor Burton after a seven-year relationship with him.

On March 17, 2006, Holiday Inn announced its sponsorship of the 29 for ten races with Burton returning as its driver. The new car made its 2006 debut at Richmond. Burton finished in the top ten seven out of the ten times the car raced in 2006, including a win at Dover in June. Burton started 36th after qualifying was rained out, and passed Kurt Busch with 18 laps to go.

Multiple Drivers (2007–2009)
In 2007, the No. 29 went full-time and, like the No. 21 several years before, Childress set out to win the owners' championship for a second time without a full-time driver. Burton and Scott Wimmer, who had just lost a Cup Series ride due to lack of sponsorship, shared the No. 29 with Holiday Inn sponsoring. Burton won five times including the finale at Homestead and Wimmer put together several strong finishes in his time in the car, and Childress had his second Busch Series owners' championship in which no full-time driver raced for the team.

Holiday Inn signed a multi-year extension near the end of 2007, with Scott Wimmer signing on for 23 races, and Burton filling out the rest. The new deal also brought on branding from Holiday Inn Express, which included commercials featuring Burton. Burton had two poles, but also had two DNFs and went winless in 13 starts. Wimmer, meanwhile had a pole at Bristol and 13 top 10s. This included a win at Nashville, where he went by teammate Clint Bowyer with 21 laps to go to take the victory. Wimmer left the team following the 2008 season.

The 2009 season saw a change in the driver lineup for the No. 29 team. Longtime driver Jeff Burton was joined by Cup teammate and 2008 Nationwide Series Champion Clint Bowyer, as well as up and comer Stephen Leicht. Bowyer's championship crew chief Dan Deeringhoff also moved from the No. 2 team over to the 29 for all three drivers. After seeing Burton's name on the window of the car during a photoshoot (Burton being the longest-tenured in the 29), the three drivers entered into a competition between each other: whoever could score the most wins in the 17 races between February and July would have their name placed on the car for the remainder of the season, including the other drivers' appearances. Burton was set to drive 7 events in the first half of the season, Bowyer in 6 events including the opener at Daytona International Speedway, and Leicht at four standalone events. The drivers did not have as much success as anticipated; Bowyer scored the team's only two wins (the 2nd races at both Daytona and Dover), Burton had 10 top 10s but only two top 5s, and Leicht had 6 top 10s in nine total starts with a best finish of 6th (twice). Burton also made his 300th career Nationwide Series start at Charlotte Motor Speedway in May. After 2009, RCR shut down the team after Holiday Inn pulled its sponsorship.

Car No. 29 results

Car No. 33 history

Multiple Drivers (2012–2015)

In 2012, the No. 33 car was transferred to RCR to run for the owner's championship. 2011 champion Tony Stewart drove the No. 33 with sponsorship from Nabisco's Oreo and Ritz brands at the season opener in Daytona. Kevin Harvick ran 13 races with South Point, Pinnacle Foods, Hunt Brothers Pizza and AdvancePierre Foods sponsoring, Brendan Gaughan drove for 10 races with South Point sponsoring, Menard ran for 7 races, and Max Papis drove at Road America, both with sponsorship from Menards and Rheem. Harvick would be the only driver to win in the No. 33, winning at Richmond and Texas.

The No. 33 car returned in 2013 mainly driven by Harvick and Ty Dillon. Tony Stewart would take the No. 33 team to victory lane at the season opener at Daytona, which was marred by a last lap incident. The No. 33 team would take its second and last win of the season with Harvick at Atlanta. Dakoda Armstrong ran Fontana with sponsorship from WinField. Paul Menard, Max Papis, Truck series driver Matt Crafton, and Ryan Gifford all took turns driving the car with MENARDS sponsorship.

In 2014, Menard returned to the car for a few races, scoring a win at Michigan. Rookie Cale Conley drove several races with OKUMA and Iraq and Afghanistan Veterans of America sponsoring.

For 2015, Austin Dillon, Menard, and Brandon Jones shared the ride with sponsorship from Rheem and Menards. Menard scored a win in August at Road America in his native Wisconsin, taking the lead on pit strategy and holding off Ryan Blaney.

Brandon Jones (2016–2017)

For 2016, Brandon Jones will run full-time, competing for Rookie of the Year. Menards and Nexteer Automotive will sponsor the effort. Mike Hillman Jr. was named the crew chief for the team. In his first season with the team he would finish 10th in points with 13 top tens, however he regressed in 2017 missing the chase and scoring only 3 top tens to finish 16th in points.

On November 17, 2017, it was announced that RCR is downsizing to three teams in 2018, shutting down the 33 and 62 team after the 2017 season.

Car No. 33 results

Car No. 62 history
Brendan Gaughan (2014–2017)

In 2014, Brendan Gaughan and crew chief Shane Wilson moved up from the Truck Series to the Nationwide Series, bringing family-owned South Point Hotel, Casino & Spa and longtime number 62 with him. The team used the owners' points of the No. 33 team from 2013; the No. 33 scaled back to part-time. Gaughan scored his first career Nationwide win at Road America in June, after struggling early and sliding off the track on several occasions, but gaining an advantage as downpours forced the competitors to switch to treaded rain tires. When pole-sitter Alex Tagliani ran out of fuel before a Green-White-Checkered finish, Gaughan assumed the lead and fended off Chase Elliott and a hard-charging Tagliani (on fresh slick tires). Brendan dedicated the win to his late grandfather Jackie Gaughan. Gaughan scored his second win of the season at Kentucky in September, passing teammate Ty Dillon on the final restart. Gaughan scored a total of seven top tens to finish eighth in points.

Gaughan and South Point returned for 2015. At Richmond in May, two pit crew members from the 62 team were injured in a fire when fuel from a malfunctioning gas can ignited. The next week, Gaughan was involved in a crash at Talladega that sent the 62 car spinning down pit road, injuring two crew members from Biagi-DenBeste Racing. Gaughan's best finish of the season was a runner up at California.

Gaughan returned for 2016. Gaughan did not get back to victory lane in 2016 but scored 4 top 5s and 16 top tens throughout the season including a 2nd place at Road America(the site of his first win).

Brendan Gaughan and South Point returned for the 2017 season, but he failed to score a victory after running solidly all year. However, on November 17, 2017, it was announced that RCR is downsizing to three teams in 2018, shutting down the 33 and 62 teams after the 2017 season.

Car No. 62 results

Camping World Truck Series

Truck No. 2 history

Multiple Drivers (2012)
For 2012, RCR took over the No. 2 truck of KHI that won the Owners Championship in 2011. The truck was split by Tim George Jr. running 12 races with Applebee's sponsoring, with a best finish of 9th, Brendan Gaughan in 7 races with a best finish of 2nd, and Harvick at both Martinsville races and Dover, winning at the spring Martinsville race. George Jr. was set to run another partial season in 2013, but he decided to move to Wauters Motorsports instead.

Part Time (2014)
Austin Dillon ran the No. 2 truck at Eldora in 2014 with sponsorship from American Ethanol.

Truck No. 3 history
Mike Skinner (1995–1996)

In the infant years of the CWTS (then known as the SuperTruck Series), RCR fielded its own truck team, the No. 3 Goodwrench Chevy. 37-year-old driver Mike Skinner was signed to drive the truck for the 1995 season. Skinner won the series' inaugural race at Phoenix International Raceway, passing Winston Cup driver Terry Labonte on the final lap of the race. He went on to win eight races, and won the series first championship by a 126-point margin. Skinner won eight more races and finished third in points in 1996. Skinner scored a total of 16 wins and 15 poles over two seasons.

Jay Sauter (1997–1999)
After Skinner moved onto the Cup series, Jay Sauter hopped on board, winning four times and finishing in the top 10 in points all three years. He was the last driver to win for RCR in the NASCAR Truck Series, until July 11, 2010, when Childress's grandson, Austin Dillon, won the Lucas Oil 200 at Iowa Speedway. After 1999, Childress moved the program up to the NASCAR Busch Series.

Austin Dillon (2009–2011)

The truck team returned during the 2009 season as the No. 3 Chevrolet Silverado driven by Childress's grandson, Austin Dillon for the inaugural race at Iowa Speedway. Dillon would start 9th and finish 12th despite an early spin.

In 2010, Dillon drove the No. 3 truck full-time sponsored by Bass Pro Shops. Austin won an impressive 5 poles, 2 wins (Iowa and Vegas), and had 15 top tens en route to a 5th-place finish in the championship and the 2010 ROTY award.

In 2011, Dillon drove the No. 3 truck to two wins at Nashville and Chicago, winning the championship over Johnny Sauter.

Ty Dillon (2012–2013)
After winning the Truck Series championship, Austin moved up to the Nationwide Series, passing down the No. 3 truck to his brother Ty Dillon for 2012. Ty would take his first win at Atlanta and nearly won the championship at Homestead before crashing while battling Kyle Larson. Ty finished 4th in the standings.

In the 2013 WinStar World Casino 350K, Dillon won the 100th victory in NASCAR for a No. 3.

Part-time (2014)
Ty Dillon returned to the No. 3 truck with Bass Pro Shops for the dirt race at Eldora in 2014. After the Eldora race, Austin Dillon then won with the No. 3 at Pocono, with Yuengling as a sponsor.

Truck No. 39 history

Part Time (2013)
In 2013 RCR purchased the No. 39 owners points from RSS Racing to field the truck for Austin Dillon in the inaugural Mudsummer Classic at Eldora Speedway, with sponsorship from American Ethanol. Dillon led a race-high 63 laps, and won after a green-white-checker finish. The truck, the trophy and the famed piece of dirt track are on display at the NASCAR Hall of Fame. The No. 39 owners points were then sold back to RSS Racing.

Truck No. 22 & 62 history

Joey Coulter as the 22 (2011–2012)
Childress' second truck entry debuted in 2011 with Joey Coulter behind the wheel of the No. 22. Coulter stayed consistent throughout the year, having the least DNF's among all other rookies. Coulter would eventually prevail over Nelson Piquet Jr. and Parker Kligerman to win Rookie of the Year. Coulter would get his first win in the Pocono Mountains 125 at Pocono Raceway, his first win in 36 attempts in the Camping World Truck Series.

Brendan Gaughan as the 62 (2013)
For 2013, Truck Series veteran Brendan Gaughan drove the truck, now numbered 62, for the full season. Gaughan would come close to finding victory lane on multiple occasions, scoring 10 top 5s and 13 top 10s to finish 7th in points. Gaughan and the No. 62 team moved up to the Nationwide series in 2014.

Driver development
RCR has featured a strong development program since the 1990s that has groomed several NASCAR regulars, most notably 2014 Cup Series Champion Kevin Harvick and Richard Childress' own grandsons Austin and Ty Dillon. Other notable former development drivers include Johnny Sauter, Mike Skinner, Clint Bowyer, Timothy Peters, John Wes Townley, Joey Coulter, and Ryan Gifford.

K&N Pro Series and ARCA Racing Series

RCR fielded a 31 car in the ARCA Racing Series in 2006, with Kevin Harvick Incorporated driver Burney Lamar running three races and RCR development driver Timothy Peters running one. The car returned in 2007 in six races, with Peters, Alex Yontz, and Tim McCreadie, scoring three top-ten finishes.

In 2008, Austin Dillon ran the full Camping World East Series schedule in the No. 3 Garage Equipment Supply Chevrolet. Initially driving for Andy Santerre Motorsports, Dillon moved under the RCR umbrella after four races. Dillon scored a win in his series debut at Greenville-Pickens Speedway (after Peyton Sellers winning car was disqualified) and finished second in points. Dillon also ran a single ARCA Racing Series event at Rockingham Speedway, finishing seventh in the No. 31 Chevrolet.

The 3 car ran five East Series races in 2009 sponsored by longtime RCR partner Mom N' Pops, with Austin Dillon running two races and brother Ty Dillon running three. Ryan Gifford ran four races in the East Series in the 29 Shell/Pennzoil Chevrolet with 3 top 10s, and made one start in the West Series. Austin also ran three ARCA races in the No. 31, with two second-place finishes. Kyle Grissom, son of Steve Grissom, drove the car at Rockingham to a 16th-place finish.

Ty Dillon ran eight of the ten K&N East Series races in 2010, scoring a win at Gresham Motorsports Park. Dillon also ran three ARCA races, scoring two victories in the No. 41 Chevrolet. The team also fielded the No. 31 Chevy full-time in ARCA for Tim George Jr., finishing 9th in points with five top 10 finishes. Dillon moved full-time in the ARCA Series in 2011 along with George Jr. Dillon won the ARCA championship with an impressive seven wins and seven poles. George improved to 7th in points and scored a weather-shortened win at Pocono.

Sponsorships
RCR has had numerous sponsor relationships over the years.  From 1988 to 2007, Goodwrench GM Certified Service was a primary sponsor, finally ending its sponsorship in 2007.  Starting in 2001, Cingular Wireless began a four-year sponsorship with RCR, which led to a sponsorship controversy after Cingular was merged with AT&T. Starting in 2001, The Hershey Company became an RCR sponsor with its candy brands such as Reese's Fast Break, Hershey's Kissables, Ice Breakers candy and Reese's Peanut Butter Cups Big Cup.

Partnerships and affiliations

ECR Engines
ECR Engines, also known as ECR Technologies and formerly Earnhardt-Childress Racing Technologies, is the engine department for Richard Childress Racing, located on the RCR campus in Welcome, North Carolina. The company builds Chevrolet engines for RCR and several teams in the NASCAR Cup Series, Xfinity Series, Truck Series, and ARCA Racing Series. It also produces engines for all Cadillac DPi-V.Rs in the IMSA WeatherTech SportsCar Championship series. Current ECR clients include Legacy Motor Club, Beard Motorsports, Kaulig Racing, Action Express Racing, Trackhouse Racing, NY Racing Team, The Money Team Racing, Our Motorsports, Jordan Anderson Racing, Alpha Prime Racing, Big Machine Racing Team, and JDC-Miller Motorsports. Former clients included Furniture Row Racing, Wayne Taylor Racing, JTG Daugherty Racing, Tommy Baldwin Racing, Leavine Family Racing, Chip Ganassi Racing, StarCom Racing, Germain Racing, Richard Petty Motorsports and Juncos Racing.

The partnership was formed in May 2007 as a cooperation between Dale Earnhardt, Inc. and Richard Childress Racing to develop and build common engines for the Chevrolet NASCAR Cup Series and Xfinity Series teams campaigned by the two companies. The partnership was inherited in 2008 by Earnhardt Ganassi Racing, following the merger between DEI and Chip Ganassi Racing. At the time, the Nationwide Series (now Xfinity Series) and Truck Series engine departments were located at the DEI facility in Mooresville. The company is now known as ECR Engines, no longer connected with DEI or CGR. In 2016, the company became a wholly owned subsidiary of RCR.

ECR Engines has secured 8 straight IMSA WeatherTech SportsCar Engine Manufacturers Championships from 2012 - 2018 with 5 overall wins at the Rolex 24 At Daytona in years 2014, 2017–2020.

Technical alliances
RCR also holds technical alliances with several teams, including Germain Racing, Richard Petty Motorsports, and StarCom Racing in the Cup Series, as well as Kaulig Racing in the Xfinity Series. Under these relationships, RCR provides engines, equipment, and technical support. RCR's first alliance model was in the mid-1990s as RAD (Richard, Andy, and Dale), an aerodynamics program shared with DEI and Andy Petree Racing.

RCR previously held a successful alliance with Furniture Row Racing, JTG Daugherty Racing, Leavine Family Racing, and GMS Racing.

In 2021, RCR and Hendrick Motorsports will formalize a joint venture focused on engine R&D and the establishment of a common Chevrolet engine specification. The effort will be led by Jeff Andrews of Hendrick Motorsports and Richie Gilmore of RCR

Sponsorship controversies

2007
Following the 2007 Daytona 500, the paint scheme of Kevin Harvick's winning No. 29 car infuriated NASCAR fuel supplier Sunoco, particularly the large Shell Oil logos on the car and team uniforms. Harvick had also worn his Shell firesuit during the Busch Series race he won the day before. Sunoco believed its exclusive rights to provide fuel to the sport also gave them exclusive marketing rights to gasoline, with other companies' limited to marketing secondary products such as motor oil. The 29 team altered its paint scheme the following week with smaller Shell decals, and larger emphasis of co-sponsor Pennzoil. It is to note that Sunoco sponsored Billy Hagan's race team from 1989 to 1992 with Sterling Marlin and Terry Labonte while Unocal 76 was the fuel supplier. Shell/Pennzoil remains in the sport with Team Penske's No. 22.

Meanwhile, AT&T had repeatedly requested that NASCAR allow them to advertise the AT&T Mobility brand on the No. 31 car following their merger with Cingular Wireless, but NASCAR refused to allow it, citing the Sprint Nextel contract. Cingular and Alltel (the sponsor of Team Penske's No. 12) had been grandfathered in when Nextel entered the sport in 2004, with the drivers wearing white Nextel Cup Series logos on their fire suits, but the change in ownership of the former led Sprint to contest the sponsorship. After trying and failing to get NASCAR to approve the addition of the globe logo to the rear of the car, AT&T filed a lawsuit against NASCAR on March 16, 2007. On May 18, a federal judge ruled that AT&T should be allowed to replace the Cingular logos with AT&T logos, and said that AT&T was likely to win the lawsuit. The AT&T logo ran on the No. 31 at the NASCAR Nextel Cup All-Star Challenge on May 19 and every race afterwards until NASCAR ordered the sponsorship off before the 2007 Sharpie 500. RCR and Jeff Burton went a step further, with Burton showing up in a logo-less firesuit, and the black and orange car ran without Cingular or AT&T logos. A settlement before the Chevy Rock and Roll 400 was made where AT&T Mobility could sponsor the car until the end of 2008.

See also
Childress Vineyards

References

External links

 Official website for Richard Childress Racing
 

American auto racing teams
Companies based in North Carolina
Entertainment companies established in 1969
Dale Earnhardt
NASCAR teams
ARCA Menards Series teams
1969 establishments in North Carolina